Adrienne-Joi Johnson (born January 2, 1963) is an American actress, choreographer, fitness trainer, and life coach. Acting since 1987, Johnson has made many guest appearances on sitcoms, television dramas and music videos; she also has numerous supporting roles in films, including House Party and Baby Boy.

Early life and education
Johnson attended Rumson-Fair Haven Regional High School in New Jersey and graduated with honors in 1985 from Spelman College in Atlanta. She is a member of Delta Sigma Theta sorority.

Career
She has appeared in A Different World, In the Heat of the Night,  The Fresh Prince of Bel-Air, Amen, the short-lived Sirens, Chicago Hope,  The Jamie Foxx Show, and Touched by an Angel. She has also appeared in television movies such as A Mother's Courage: the Mary Thomas Story (1989), Clippers (1991), Murder Without Motive: The Edmund Perry Story (1992), Love, Lies & Lullabies (1993), and The Beast (1996).

Johnson has appeared in theatrical releases and independent films such as School Daze (1988), House Party (1990), Double Trouble (1992), Sister Act (1992), The Inkwell (1994), High Freakquency (1998), Two Shades of Blue (2000), Tara (2001), Baby Boy (2001), and Skin Deep (2003).

Filmography

Film

Television

Awards and nominations

References

External links

Talk with Audrey interview with AJ Johnson 2011.  AJ shares her thoughts on moving and dieting.

Living people
American exercise instructors
American film actresses
American television actresses
Actresses from New Jersey
Spelman College alumni
Delta Sigma Theta members
African-American actresses
1963 births